Sonia Cárdeñas (born 22 February 1970) is a former synchronized swimmer from Mexico.

References

External links
 

1970 births
Living people
Mexican synchronized swimmers
Olympic synchronized swimmers of Mexico
Synchronized swimmers at the 1988 Summer Olympics
Synchronized swimmers at the 1992 Summer Olympics
Synchronized swimmers at the 1991 World Aquatics Championships
Pan American Games medalists in synchronized swimming
Pan American Games silver medalists for Mexico
Pan American Games bronze medalists for Mexico
Synchronized swimmers at the 1991 Pan American Games
Medalists at the 1991 Pan American Games
20th-century Mexican women
21st-century Mexican women